Milorad Dragićević (6 October 1904 – 7 December 1975) was a Serbian and Yugoslavian international footballer.

Biography
Dragićević was born in Belgrade, Kingdom of Serbia, and started playing in the youth team of SK Jugoslavija. In 1923 he played with SK Jadran Beograd. He became notable while playing for the "Blues", BSK Beograd from 1924 to 1929 when he stopped playing because of an injury. He played either as left winger or striker.

Dragićević played two matches for the Yugoslav national team,  both matches against Romania the Friendly Nations Cup, one in 1926 and another in 1928.

Serbian sports journalist in the book "Večiti rivali" describes him as one of the best Serbian players of the 1920s and a holder of one of the strongest shots. After the Second World War he worked as a cashier in the Football Association of Yugoslavia until 1970. He died in Belgrade in 1975.

References

Serbian footballers
Yugoslav footballers
Yugoslavia international footballers
SK Jugoslavija players
OFK Beograd players
Yugoslav First League players
Association football midfielders
Association football forwards
1904 births
1975 deaths